The 1978 Eastern Illinois Panthers football team represented Eastern Illinois University during the 1978 NCAA Division II football season, and completed the 78th season of Panther football. The Panthers played their home games at O'Brien Stadium in Charleston, Illinois. The 1978 team came off a 1–10 record from the previous season. The 1978 team was led by coach Darrell Mudra. The team finished the regular season with a 9–2 record and made the NCAA Division II playoffs. The Panthers defeated Delaware, 10–9, in the National Championship Game en route to the program's first NCAA Division II Football Championship.

Schedule

References

Eastern Illinois
Eastern Illinois Panthers football seasons
NCAA Division II Football Champions
Eastern Illinois Panthers football